The Fortore (Latin: Fertor or Frento) is a river which flows through the provinces of Benevento, Campobasso and Foggia in southern Italy.

From there it runs in a northerly direction through a narrow and twisting valley between Daunian Mountains. After , near Castelvetere in Val Fortore, it exits from the province of Benevento. In its lower course it forms the border between the provinces of Campobasso and Foggia. The Fortore flows into the Adriatic Sea not far from Lake Lesina.

See also
Battle of Civitate

Rivers of Italy
Rivers of the Province of Foggia
Rivers of the Province of Benevento
Rivers of the Province of Campobasso
Adriatic Italian coast basins